The Australian cricket team toured South Africa for cricket matches during the 2005–06 South African cricket season. Australia won the Tests with a 3–0 whitewash, but lost both the limited overs series, the one-off Twenty20 and the five-match ODI, which was concluded with what was described as "the greatest ODI ever".

Squads

T20I series

Only T20I

ODI series

1st ODI

2nd ODI

This was Australia's second worst loss in their history of One Day internationals.

3rd ODI

4th ODI

5th ODI

The 5th One Day International cricket match between South Africa and Australia, played on 12 March 2006 at New Wanderers Stadium, Johannesburg, has been acclaimed by many media commentators as being one of the greatest One Day International matches ever played. The match broke many cricket records, including both the first and the second team innings score of over 400 runs. Australia won the toss and elected to bat first. They scored 434 for 4 off their 50 overs, beating the previous record of 398-5 by Sri Lanka against Kenya in 1996. In reply, South Africa scored 438–9, winning by one wicket with one ball to spare.

Test series

1st Test

As well as gaining his Test match debut, Stuart Clark, in scoring the best bowling figures for both of South Africa's innings, won himself Man of The Match.

2nd Test

3rd Test

References

2006 in South African cricket
2006 in Australian cricket
2005
2005–06 South African cricket season
International cricket competitions in 2005–06